Kwintsheul is a village in the Dutch province of South Holland. It is a part of the municipality of Westland, and lies about 2 km southwest of the border of The Hague.

The statistical area "Kwintsheul", which also can include the surrounding countryside, has a population of around 3360 people.

References

Populated places in South Holland
Westland (municipality), Netherlands